Metropolitan Grove is a passenger rail station on the MARC Brunswick Line between Washington, D.C. and Martinsburg, WV (with an extension to Frederick, MD). Metropolitan Grove Station is nearest Browns Station Park. The large Watkins Mill Town Center development is adjacent and still under construction. The future Corridor Cities Transitway light rail/bus rapid transit line will connect with MARC at Metropolitan Grove.

Station layout
The station is not compliant with the Americans with Disabilities Act of 1990, lacking raised platforms for level boarding.

References

External links
 MARC Station Information - Brunswick Line

1987 establishments in Maryland
Brunswick Line
Gaithersburg, Maryland
MARC Train stations
Railway stations in Montgomery County, Maryland
Railway stations in the United States opened in 1987